Stemmatophora borgialis is a species of snout moth in the genus Stemmatophora. It was described by Philogène Auguste Joseph Duponchel in 1832. It is found in France, Spain, Portugal and Italy.

References

Moths described in 1832
Pyralini
Moths of Europe